KQDY (94.5 FM), known as "KQ 94.5", is a radio station located in Bismarck, North Dakota, United States, owned by iHeartMedia, Inc. The stations airs a country music format competing with Townsquare Media's KUSB "US 103.3" and Radio Bismarck-Mandan's KKBO "105.9 The Big Rig".

iHeartMedia, Inc. also owns KFYR 550 (News/Talk), KXMR 710 (Sports), KBMR 1130 (Classic country), KYYY 92.9 (CHR/Top 40), and KSSS 101.5 (Mainstream Rock) in the Bismarck-Mandan area.

External links
KQ 94.5 official website

QDY
Country radio stations in the United States
1975 establishments in North Dakota
Radio stations established in 1975
IHeartMedia radio stations